Brian Sinclair may refer to:

Brian Sinclair (footballer)
Brian Sinclair (veterinary surgeon)
Death of Brian Sinclair